The Hudson's Bay Company tokens represented the unit of currency used in the fur trade for many decades. The largest—one "Made Beaver"—was equal in value to the skin on an adult male beaver in good condition. Smaller sizes represented one-half, one-quarter, and one-eighth of a Made-Beaver. One side of the brass token bears the Hudson's Bay Company's coat of arms and the other its value.

Before these brass tokens came into use, a Made-Beaver was represented by a stick, porcupine quill, and ivory disc, a musket ball, or anything else agreed upon by trader and trapper. The trapper would be handed a number of units agreed upon—representing the value of his catch—and with these would make his purchases from the store. The tokens were designed by George Simpson Mctavish of Albany Fort in 1854.

References

Hudson's Bay Company
Token coins